The 33rd Chicago Film Critics Association Awards were announced on December 21, 2020. The awards honor the best in film for 2020. The nominations were announced on December 18, 2020. Nomadland received the most nominations (7), followed by Da 5 Bloods (6), First Cow (6) and I'm Thinking of Ending Things (6).

Winners and nominees
The winners and nominees for the 33rd Chicago Film Critics Association Awards are as follows:

Awards

Awards breakdown

The following films received multiple nominations:

The following films received multiple wins:

References

External links
 

2020 film awards
 2020